Les Misérables is a 2012 epic period musical film directed by Tom Hooper from a screenplay by William Nicholson, Alain Boublil, who wrote the original French lyrics, Claude-Michel Schönberg, who wrote the music, and Herbert Kretzmer, who wrote the English lyrics. The film is based on the 1985 West End English translation of the 1980 French musical by Boublil and Schönberg, which itself is adapted from the 1862 French novel of the same name by Victor Hugo. The film is a British-American venture distributed by Universal Pictures. The film stars an ensemble cast led by Hugh Jackman, Russell Crowe, Anne Hathaway, Eddie Redmayne, Amanda Seyfried, Helena Bonham Carter, and Sacha Baron Cohen.

Set in France during the early nineteenth century, the film tells the story of Jean Valjean who, while being hunted for decades by the ruthless policeman Javert after breaking parole, agrees to care for a factory worker's daughter. The story reaches resolution against the background of the June Rebellion of 1832.

Following the release of the 1980 musical, a film adaptation was mired in "development hell" for over ten years, as the rights were passed on to several major studios, and various directors and actors considered. In 2011, producer Cameron Mackintosh sold the film rights to Eric Fellner, who financed the film through Working Title Films. In June 2011, production of the film officially began, with Hooper and Mackintosh serving as director and producer, and the main characters were cast later that year. Principal photography began in March 2012, with a budget of $61million. Filming took place on locations in Greenwich, London, Chatham, Winchester, Bath, and Portsmouth, England; in Gourdon, France; and on soundstages in Pinewood Studios.

Les Misérables premiered at Leicester Square in London on 5 December 2012, and was theatrically released on 25 December 2012 in the United States and on 11 January 2013 in the United Kingdom. It grossed over $442million worldwide. It received generally positive reviews: many critics praised the direction, production values, musical numbers, and the ensemble cast, with Jackman, Hathaway, Redmayne, Seyfried, Aaron Tveit, and Samantha Barks being the most often singled out for praise. However, Crowe's performance as Javert and singing were said to be the worst parts of the film. The film was nominated for eight awards at the 85th Academy Awards, winning three, and received numerous other accolades.

Plot

In 1815, French prisoner Jean Valjean is released from the Bagne of Toulon after a nineteen-year sentence for stealing bread for his nephew. His paroled status prevents him from finding work or accommodation, but he is sheltered by the kindly Bishop of Digne. Valjean attempts to steal his silverware and is captured by police, but the bishop claims he gave him the silver, and tells him to use it to begin an honest life. Moved, Valjean breaks his parole and assumes a new identity, intending to redeem others.

Eight years later, Valjean is a respected factory owner and mayor of Montreuil, Pas-de-Calais. He is startled when Javert, formerly a Toulon prison guard, arrives as his new chief of police. Witnessing Valjean rescuing a worker trapped under a cart makes Javert suspect the former's true identity. Meanwhile, one of Valjean's workers, Fantine, is fired by the foreman when she is revealed to have an illegitimate daughter, Cosette, living with the greedy Thénardier family, to whom Fantine sends her earnings.

Out on the streets and increasingly unwell, Fantine sells her hair, teeth, and eventually her sexual favors to support Cosette. Javert arrests her when she attacks an abusive customer, but Valjean recognises her and takes her to the hospital. Learning that a man has been wrongly identified as him, Valjean reveals his identity to the court before returning to the dying Fantine, promising to care for Cosette. Javert arrives to arrest him but he escapes to the Thénardiers' inn. Valjean pays Fantine's debts, then flees from Javert with Cosette. They hide in a convent, aided by the worker he had rescued.

Nine years later, Valjean has become a philanthropist to the poor in Paris. General Lamarque, the only government official sympathetic to the poor, dies, and the revolutionist group Friends of the ABC plot against the monarchy. Marius Pontmercy, a member of the Friends, falls in love with Cosette at first sight and asks Éponine, the Thénardiers' daughter, to find her. He and Cosette meet and confess their love; Éponine, herself in love with Marius, is heartbroken.

Thénardier attempts to rob Valjean's house, but Éponine stops him. Fearing Javert is near, Valjean plans to flee to England with Cosette. She leaves Marius a letter, which Éponine hides from him. During Lamarque's funeral procession, the revolt begins and barricades are built across Paris. Javert poses as an ally to spy on the rebels, but the street urchin Gavroche exposes him as a policeman. During the first skirmish against the soldiers, Éponine takes a bullet for Marius and dies in his arms, giving him Cosette's letter and confessing her love. Marius' answer to Cosette is intercepted by Valjean, who joins the revolt to protect him. Valjean offers to execute the imprisoned Javert, but releases him instead, pretending he shot him. 

By dawn, the soldiers storm the barricade and kill everyone except Marius and Valjean, who escape into the sewers. Thénardier comes across an unconscious Marius and steals his ring, before Valjean threatens him into revealing the way out. Valjean finds Javert waiting for him, but seeing that Marius is close to death, he lets them go. Morally disturbed by the mercy of his nemesis and his own in return, Javert kills himself by throwing himself in the Seine. Marius recovers, traumatized by the death of his friends.

Marius and Cosette are reunited but Valjean, concerned his past would threaten their happiness, makes plans to leave. He reveals his past to Marius, who promises to remain silent. At Marius and Cosette's wedding, the Thénardiers crash the reception to blackmail him; Thénardier claims he witnessed Valjean carrying a murdered corpse and shows the stolen ring, which Marius recognises as his own. Realizing Valjean saved him from the barricade, Marius forces Thénardier to reveal where he is, and the Thénardiers are thrown out of the wedding. At the convent, Cosette and Marius find the dying Valjean, who gives them letters of confession before dying peacefully. His spirit is guided by visions of Fantine and the Bishop to join Éponine, Gavroche and the Friends of the ABC in the afterlife.

Cast
 Hugh Jackman as Jean Valjean, a Frenchman released from Toulon prison after 19 years of imprisonment for stealing bread and attempting to escape the prison. Around June 2011, Jackman met with producer Cameron Mackintosh to audition in New York. To prepare for the role, Jackman lost  and later regained  to mirror his character's success. He avoided drinking coffee, warmed up at least 15 minutes every day, kept Ricola lozenges, drank as much as seven litres of water per day, sat in steam three times a day, took cold baths and used a wet washcloth over his face while flying, citing the musical's original co-director Trevor Nunn for his training. He worked extensively with vocal coach Joan Lader, and managed to extend his vocal range, which he originally categorised a high baritone, up to tenor.
 Russell Crowe as Javert, a police inspector dedicating his life to imprisoning Valjean once again. Before being cast as Javert, Crowe was initially dissatisfied with the character. On his way to Europe for a friend's wedding, Crowe came to London and met with producer Cameron Mackintosh. On meeting with Tom Hooper, he told the director about his concerns about playing Javert, and after meeting with him, Crowe was "determined to be involved in the project and play Javert. I think it had something to do with Tom's passion for what he was about to undertake, and he clearly understood the problems and he clearly understood the challenge." On visiting Victor Hugo's home in Paris, Crowe said, "[The house's curator] told me about [19th century detective Eugene Francois] Vidocq, a man who had been both a prisoner and a policeman, the man credited with inventing undercover police work when he established the Brigade de Surete."
 Anne Hathaway as Fantine, the mother of Cosette and a struggling factory worker, who resorts to prostitution to send money to her daughter. When Hathaway was cast, she stated, "There was resistance because I was between their ideal ages for the parts—maybe not mature enough for Fantine but past the point where I could believably play Cosette." 
 Amanda Seyfried as Cosette, the illegitimate daughter of Fantine, who is kept by the Thénardiers until Valjean buys her from them. On developing Cosette, Seyfried said, "In the little time that I had to explain Cosette and give the audience a reason [to see her as] a symbol of love and strength and light in this tragedy, I needed to be able to convey things you may not have connected with in the show." A vocal coach was enlisted to help her with the songs. Isabelle Allen plays Cosette as a child. On working with her fellow actors, Allen said, "They gave us lots of tips and mostly [made] sure we were all OK. They were really nice."
 Eddie Redmayne as Marius Pontmercy, a student revolutionary who is friends with the Thenardiers' daughter, Éponine, but falls in love with Cosette. He found director Hooper's vision "incredibly helpful". On collaborating with Hooper, Redmayne said, "He was incredibly collaborative. Certainly during the rehearsal process, we sat with Tom and the Victor Hugo book adding things." It was Redmayne who suggested to Hooper that his character's song, "Empty Chairs at Empty Tables", should begin a cappella in order to better express Marius' guilt and pain.
 Helena Bonham Carter and Sacha Baron Cohen as the Thénardiers, a pair of swindling innkeepers. Hooper previously collaborated with Bonham Carter in The King's Speech, in which she portrayed Queen Elizabeth, King George VI's wife. Baron Cohen and Bonham Carter previously co-starred in the film adaptation of the musical Sweeney Todd: The Demon Barber of Fleet Street. When Baron Cohen accepted the role of Thénardier, he had to abandon Django Unchained.
 Samantha Barks as Éponine, the Thénardiers' daughter. Having previously played the role at the 25th Anniversary concert and in the West End production, Barks said "there was similarities in playing the role—they're the same character—but Éponine in the novel and Éponine in the musical are two kind of different girls, so to me it was the thrill of merging those two together, to get something that still had that heart and soul that we all connect to in the musical, but also the awkward, self-loathing teenager that we see in the novel, trying to merge those two together." She found Jackman "fascinating to learn from, and I feel like that's the way it should be done". Natalya Wallace plays a young Éponine.
Hoping to play Marius, Tveit submitted an audition tape in which he sang  "Empty Chairs at Empty Tables" and "In My Life". He had never performed any role in the musical. He also said of Enjolras that "once I got more and more familiar with the material and when I read the novel, I was like, 'Wow this is a really, really great role,' and I felt very much better suited for it." Tveit said the shooting of the film was "almost as grueling as a marathon".
 Daniel Huttlestone as Gavroche, the wise and heroic street urchin, who displays a fresh, lucid and ironic look at contemporary French society. He had performed the same role at the Queen's Theatre in London, staying with them for a year before being cast to reprise Gavroche in the film adaptation. His performance was praised both by public and critics, some of whom viewed him as a scene-stealer.

Colm Wilkinson and Frances Ruffelle, two of the original cast members involved in the West End and Broadway productions of the English version (as Jean Valjean and Éponine, respectively), make appearances. Wilkinson plays the Bishop of Digne, while Ruffelle plays a prostitute. Hadley Fraser, who previously played Grantaire in the 25th Anniversary Concert and Javert and Marius on the West End, appears as the Army General. Another West End actor, Gina Beck, appears as one of the "Turning Women". Michael Jibson plays the foreman of the factory in which Fantine works and is fired from. Bertie Carvel has a cameo as Bamatabois, a dandy who sexually harasses Fantine. Stephen Tate plays Fauchelevent, a man Valjean rescues from under a cart that later helps Valjean and Cosette escape.

Several actors in the West End production of the musical appear as members of the student society, including George Blagden as Grantaire; Killian Donnelly as Combeferre; Fra Fee as Courfeyrac; Alistair Brammer as Jean Prouvaire; Hugh Skinner as Joly; Gabriel Vick as Feuilly; Iwan Lewis as Bahorel; and Stuart Neal as Bossuet. Blagden was cast in January 2012. Ian Pirie, Adam Pearce, Julian Bleach, and Marc Pickering portray Babet, Brujon, Claquesous, and Montparnasse, members of Thenadier's gang. Other stage actors including Kate Fleetwood, Hannah Waddingham, Daniel Evans and Kerry Ellis have small parts in the film along with actors who previously starred in various productions of Les Misérables.

Musical numbers

A highlights soundtrack album was released via Universal Republic 21 December 2012. Republic Records confirmed 25 January 2013, via Twitter that a 2-disc deluxe soundtrack was in production alongside the DVD and Blu-ray; it was released 19 March 2013.

The film contains every song from the original stage musical with the exception of "I Saw Him Once" and "Dog Eats Dog", although many songs have been partially or extensively cut. "The Attack on Rue Plumet" and "Little People" were especially shortened. In addition, the Bishop sings with Fantine during "Valjean's Death" instead of Eponine, as was in the stage musical. "Stars" was also moved to before "Look Down", which echoes the original 1985 London production. The lyrics of some songs were also changed to suit the changes in setting or narrative to the stage musical. In addition to the cuts, a new song, "Suddenly" was added, new music was composed for the battle scenes, and the order of several songs changed from the stage musical. Several major pieces—primarily "Who Am I?", "Stars", and the two "Soliloquy" pieces—are performed in a different key from most recordings.

 "Look Down" – Convicts, Javert, Valjean†§
 "The Bishop" – Bishop of Digne†§
 "Valjean's Soliloquy" – Valjean†§
 "At the End of the Day" – Poor, Foreman, Workers, Factory Women, Fantine, Valjean†§
 "The Runaway Cart" – Valjean, Javert
 "The Docks (Lovely Ladies)" – Sailors, Old Woman, Fantine, Crone, Whores, Pimp, Toothman§
 "I Dreamed a Dream" – Fantine†§
 "Fantine's Arrest" – Bamatabois, Fantine, Javert, Valjean§
 "Who Am I?" – Valjean§
 "Fantine's Death" – Fantine, Valjean§
 "The Confrontation" – Javert, Valjean†§
 "Castle on a Cloud" – Young Cosette, Mme. Thénardier†§
 "Master of the House" – Thénardier, Mme. Thénardier, Inn Patrons†§
 "The Well Scene" – Valjean, Young Cosette§
 "The Bargain" – Valjean, Thénardier, Mme. Thénardier§
 "The Thénardier Waltz of Treachery" – Thénardier, Valjean, Mme. Thénardier, Young Cosette§
 "Suddenly" – Valjean†§
 "The Convent" – Valjean§
 "Stars" – Javert§
 "Paris/Look Down" – Gavroche, Beggars, Enjolras, Marius, Students§
 "The Robbery" – Thénardier, Mme. Thénardier, Éponine, Valjean§
 "Javert's Intervention" – Javert, Thénardier§
 "Éponine's Errand" - Éponine, Marius
 "ABC Café/Red and Black" – Students, Enjolras, Marius, Grantaire, Gavroche†§
 "In My Life" – Cosette, Valjean, Marius, Éponine§
 "A Heart Full of Love" – Marius, Cosette, Éponine†§
 "The Attack on Rue Plumet" – Thénardier, Thieves, Éponine, Valjean
 "On My Own" – Éponine†§
 "One Day More" – Valjean, Marius, Cosette, Éponine, Enjolras, Javert, Thénardier, Mme. Thénardier, Cast of Les Misérables†§
 "Do You Hear the People Sing?" – Enjolras, Marius, Students, Beggars§
 "Building the Barricade (Upon These Stones)" – Enjolras, Javert, Gavroche, Students§
 "Javert's Arrival" – Javert, Enjolras§
 "Little People" – Gavroche, Students, Enjolras, Javert§
 "A Little Fall of Rain" – Éponine, Marius§
 "Night of Anguish" – Enjolras, Marius, Valjean, Javert, Students
 "Drink With Me" – Grantaire, Marius, Gavroche, Students†§
 "Bring Him Home" – Valjean†§
 "Dawn of Anguish" – Enjolras, Marius, Gavroche, Students§
 "The Second Attack (Death of Gavroche)" – Gavroche, Enjolras, Students, Army Officer§
 "The Sewers" – Valjean, Javert§
 "Javert's Suicide" – Javert†§
 "Turning" – Parisian women§
 "Empty Chairs at Empty Tables" – Marius†§
 "A Heart Full of Love [Reprise]" – Marius, Cosette, Valjean, Gillenormand§
 "Valjean's Confession" – Valjean, Marius§
 "Suddenly [Reprise]" – Marius, Cosette§
 "Wedding Chorale" – Chorus, Marius, Thérnardier, Mme. Thérnardier§
 "Beggars at the Feast" – Thénardier, Mme. Thénardier§
 "Valjean's Death" – Valjean, Fantine, Cosette, Marius, Bishop of Digne†§
 "Do You Hear the People Sing? [Reprise] / Epilogue" – The Cast of Les Misérables†§

 † Included on the highlights edition soundtrack
 § Included on the deluxe edition soundtrack

Production

Development
Following the release of Les Misérables (1980), a French sung-through concept album by Alain Boublil and Claude-Michel Schönberg based on the novel of the same name by Victor Hugo, the musical premiered at the Palais des Sports in Paris in 1980. The English-language West End theatre production opened at the Barbican Arts Centre on 8 October 1985. The subsequent Broadway production opened at the Broadway Theatre on 12 March 1987 and closed at the Imperial Theatre on 18 May 2003 after 6,680 performances. In 1988, Alan Parker was considered to direct a film adaptation of the Les Misérables musical. In 1991, Bruce Beresford signed on to be the film's director.

In 1992, producer Cameron Mackintosh announced that the film would be co-produced by TriStar Pictures. However, the film was abandoned. In 2005, Mackintosh later confirmed that interest in turning the musical into a film adaptation had resumed during the early months of that year. Mackintosh said that he wanted the film to be directed by "someone who has a vision for the show that will put the show's original team, including [Mackintosh], back to work." He also said that he wanted the film audiences to make it "fresh as the actual show".

In 2009, producer Eric Fellner began negotiations with Mackintosh to acquire the film's rights and concluded it near the end of 2011. Fellner, Tim Bevan, and Debra Hayward engaged William Nicholson to write a screenplay for the film. Nicholson wrote the draft within six weeks time.

The DVD/Blu-ray release of Les Misérables in Concert: The 25th Anniversary confirmed an announcement of the musical's film adaptation.

Pre-production
In March 2011, director Tom Hooper began negotiations to direct Les Misérables from the screenplay by William Nicholson. Production on the film officially began in June that year, with Cameron Mackintosh and Working Title Films co-producing. Having already approached Hooper prior to production with the desire of playing Jean Valjean, Hugh Jackman began negotiations to star in the film alongside Paul Bettany as Javert. Other stars who became attached to the project included Hathaway and Helena Bonham Carter.

In September 2011, Jackman was cast as Jean Valjean and Russell Crowe was cast as Javert. The following month, Mackintosh confirmed that Fantine would be played by Hathaway. Before Hathaway was cast, Amy Adams, Jessica Biel, Tammy Blanchard, Kristin Kreuk, Marion Cotillard, Kate Winslet and Rebecca Hall were also considered for the part. For the role, Hathaway allowed her hair to be cut short on camera for a scene in which her character sells her hair, stating that the lengths she goes to for her roles "don't feel like sacrifices. Getting to transform is one of the best parts of [acting]." The role also required her to lose .

In addition to Hathaway's weight loss, Hugh Jackman also lost an extreme amount of weight for the opening scene as Jean Valjean when he is imprisoned in a labor camp. To achieve an emaciated look, Jackman committed to a minimalistic diet and intense workouts. In an interview with Epix, Jackman revealed that he went on 45 minute morning runs on an empty stomach which Hathaway later used as a weight loss tactic with Jackman's help, and he went on a 36-hour liquid fast. This allowed him to rapidly lose ten pounds and caused his eyes and cheeks to sink severely.

In November 2011, Eddie Redmayne was cast as Marius Pontmercy. The shortlist of actresses for the role of Éponine included Scarlett Johansson, Lea Michele, Miley Cyrus, Tamsin Egerton, Taylor Swift, and Evan Rachel Wood.

In January 2012, the press reported that the role of Éponine had officially been offered to Taylor Swift. However, Swift later stated that those reports were not entirely accurate. At the end of the month, Mackintosh made a special appearance during the curtain call of the Oliver! UK tour at the Palace Theatre, Manchester, announcing that the tour's Nancy, Samantha Barks, who had played Éponine in the West End production and in the 25th Anniversary concert, would reprise the role in the film. Barks had been auditioning for 15 weeks by that point.

Originally, an unknown was sought for the role of Cosette, with an open casting call in New York City in December 2011. In January 2012, reports surfaced that Amanda Seyfried had been offered the role instead. Eddie Redmayne confirmed both Seyfried's casting and that of Bonham Carter as Madame Thénardier in an interview on 12 January. Hooper confirmed that he would stick to the musical's essentially sung-through form and would thus introduce very little additional dialogue. Hooper confirmed that the film would not be shot in 3D, expressing his opinion that it would not enhance the emotional narrative of the film and would distract audiences from the storytelling.

Following this announcement, reports surfaced in the press that Sacha Baron Cohen had begun talks to join the cast as Thénardier and that Aaron Tveit had been cast as Enjolras. Later that month, the press officially confirmed Tveit's casting as Enjolras. Colm Wilkinson and Frances Ruffelle (the original Valjean and Éponine, respectively, in the West End and Broadway productions) appeared in the film. Wilkinson played the Bishop of Digne, and Ruffelle had a cameo as a prostitute. George Blagden was cast as Grantaire. In an interview with BBC Radio 4's Front Row, Tom Hooper revealed that Claude-Michel Schönberg will be composing one new song and additional music. The director also expanded on the performers singing live on set, which he felt would eliminate the need to recapture "locked" performances and allow more creative freedom. More details of this were confirmed by Eddie Redmayne in an interview. He stated that the cast would sing to piano tracks (via earpiece) and that the orchestra would be added in post-production.

In February 2012, casting auditions involving extras for the film took place at the University of Portsmouth and Chatham Maritime in Chatham. Several days later, Mackintosh officially confirmed that Bonham Carter would play Madame Thénardier. He also announced that the title of the newly created song for the film is "Suddenly" and that it "beautifully explains what happens when Valjean takes Cosette from the inn and looks after her."

The cast began rehearsals in January 2012, with principal photography due to begin in March. The press officially confirmed Baron Cohen's casting during the latter month. No table read took place before filming.

Filming

With a production budget of $61million, principal photography of the film began 8 March 2012 in Gourdon. Filming locations in England included Boughton House, the Chantry Chapel and Cloisters at Winchester College, Winchester Cathedral Close, Her Majesty's Naval Base Portsmouth, Chatham Dockyard, St Mary the Virgin Church, Ewelme, South Oxfordshire and Pinewood Studios. In April 2012, crews built a replica of the Elephant of the Bastille in Greenwich. In the novel, Gavroche lives in the decaying monument.

On-location filming also took place at Gourdon, Alpes-Maritimes in France. Footage of Hathaway singing "I Dreamed a Dream", a song from the musical, was shown at CinemaCon 26 April 2012. Russell Crowe confirmed 5 June 2012, on Twitter that he had finished filming. He was later followed by Samantha Barks, confirming that all of her scenes had too been completed. Jackman stated that all filming had been completed 23 June 2012. Some late filming occurred in Bath, Somerset, in October 2012 where stunt shots for Javert's suicide scene had to be reshot due to an error found with this footage during post-production. Bath was not the original filming location for this scene, but the late footage was captured at Pulteney Weir.

Post-production
The film's vocals were recorded live on set using live piano accompaniments played through earpieces as a guide, with the orchestral accompaniment recorded in post-production, rather than the traditional method where the film's musical soundtracks are usually pre-recorded and played back on set to which actors lip-sync. Production sound mixer Simon Hayes used 50 DPA 4071 lavalier microphones to record the vocals. Hooper explained his choice:

Although the creative team stated that this live recording method was unique and "a world's first", many films have used this technique before, notably early talkies, when lip-syncing had not been perfected. More recent examples include the 1975 20th Century Fox film At Long Last Love; the adaptation of The Magic Flute, released that same year; the 1995 adaptation of The Fantasticks; portions of the 1996 adaptation of Andrew Lloyd Webber's Evita; the 2001 film version of Hedwig and the Angry Inch; and the 2007 film Across the Universe, with songs by the Beatles.

Producers announced 27 August 2012, that recording sessions for Les Misérables would begin in London 10 October and featured a 70-piece orchestra. They also announced that composer Claude-Michel Schönberg was composing additional music to underscore the film.

Distribution

Marketing
The film's first teaser trailer debuted online on 30 May 2012, and later in theatres with Snow White and the Huntsman, The Bourne Legacy and Argo.

Producers released an extended first look on the film's official Facebook page on 20 September 2012. This short introduces and explains Hooper's method of recording vocals live on set, comparing it to the traditional method of pre-recording the vocals in a studio months in advance. Hugh Jackman stated that filming in this way allows him more creative freedom with the material and that he "only has to worry about acting it." Both Hooper and the actors believe that this choice of production method will make the film feel much more emotional, raw, and real. The actors praised Hooper for his method and provide brief interviews throughout the video. Hooper mentions, "I thought it was an amazing opportunity to do something genuinely groundbreaking."

Clips of Jackman, Hathaway, Seyfried, Redmayne and Barks singing were received very positively, especially the teaser trailer's presentation of "I Dreamed a Dream" by Hathaway. Producers released a new poster, featuring young Cosette (in what is essentially a real-life version of the musical's emblem), played by Isabelle Allen, on 24 September 2012, on the film's official Facebook page. They released posters featuring Jean Valjean, Javert, Fantine, and Cosette on 12 October, with additional posters of Thénardiers and Marius released on 1 November 2012.

Release

Les Misérables was originally set to be released on 7 December 2012 before the studio moved it to 14 December in the United States; however, on 18 September, they delayed the film's release date to 25 December, so as not to conflict with the opening of The Hobbit: An Unexpected Journey, which opened on 14 December. Because of this, it opened alongside Django Unchained. Release date for the United Kingdom was on 11 January 2013.

Les Misérables was screened for the first time at Lincoln Center in New York City, on 23 November 2012, where it received a standing ovation from the audience. This was followed by a screening the next day in Los Angeles, which also received positive reviews.

Les Misérables premiered on 5 December 2012, at the Empire, Leicester Square in London. Red carpet footage was screened live online in an event hosted by Michael Ball, the original Marius of the West End. The film was released in select IMAX theatres in New York, Los Angeles, Toronto, and Montreal the same day as its domestic theatrical release, 25 December 2012. Les Misérables was also released internationally by IMAX theatres on 10 January 2013. The film was distributed by Universal Pictures in North America, Latin America and most of Europe, and Toho (through Toho-Towa) in Japan.

Home media
The film was confirmed for home release on 13 May 2013 on DVD, Blu-ray, and VOD in the United Kingdom; it was released in the United States on 22 March 2013. The DVD contains three featurettes: The Stars of Les Misérables, Creating the Perfect Paris, and The Original Masterwork: Victor Hugo's Les Misérables, along with an audio commentary from director Tom Hooper. The Blu-ray has all DVD features including four additional featurettes: Les Misérables Singing Live, Battle at the Barricade, The West End Connection, and Les Misérables On Location.

Reception

Box office
Les Misérables earned $148.8 million in North America and $293 million in other territories for a worldwide total of $442.3 million. In North America, Les Misérables opened 25 December 2012 in 2,808 theatres, placing first at the box office with $18.1million. This amount broke the record for the highest opening day gross for a musical film, previously held by High School Musical 3: Senior Year, and was also the second highest opening day gross for a film released on Christmas Day. It earned $27.3million in its opening weekend, placing third behind Django Unchained and The Hobbit: An Unexpected Journey.

The film was released in the United Kingdom 11 January 2013 and earned £8.1 ($13.1) million in its opening weekend, making it the largest opening weekend for a musical film, as well as for Working Title.

Critical response

The review aggregator website Rotten Tomatoes reported a 69% approval rating with an average rating of 6.9/10, based on an aggregation of 259 reviews. The site's consensus reads: "Impeccably mounted but occasionally bombastic, Les Misérables largely succeeds thanks to bravura performances from its distinguished cast." On Metacritic, the film achieved an average score of 63 out of 100 based on 41 reviews, signifying "generally favorable reviews". The film was generally praised for its acting and ensemble cast, with Jackman, Hathaway, Redmayne, Seyfried and Barks being singled out for praise. However, Crowe's performance was criticized. The live singing, which was heavily promoted in marketing for the film, received a more divided response.

Robbie Collin of The Daily Telegraph gave the film five stars: "Les Misérables is a blockbuster, and the special effects are emotional: explosions of grief; fireballs of romance; million-buck conflagrations of heartbreak. Accordingly, you should see it in its opening week, on a gigantic screen, with a fanatical crowd."

The Guardians Peter Bradshaw concurred: "Even as a non-believer in this kind of "sung-through" musical, I was battered into submission by this mesmeric and sometimes compelling film ...". Kenneth Turan of Los Angeles Times gave a positive review, saying that the film "is a clutch player that delivers an emotional wallop when it counts. You can walk into the theater as an agnostic, but you may just leave singing with the choir." Peter Travers of Rolling Stone said, "Besides being a feast for the eyes and ears, Les Misérables overflows with humor, heartbreak, rousing action and ravishing romance. Damn the imperfections, it's perfectly marvelous."

Todd McCarthy of The Hollywood Reporter said, "As the enduring success of this property has shown, there are large, emotionally susceptible segments of the population ready to swallow this sort of thing, but that doesn't mean it's good."

Manohla Dargis of The New York Times wrote: "[Director Tom] Hooper can be very good with actors. But his inability to leave any lily ungilded—to direct a scene without tilting or hurtling or throwing the camera around—is bludgeoning and deadly. By the grand finale, when tout le monde is waving the French tricolor in victory, you may instead be raising the white flag in exhausted defeat."

Justin Chang of Variety wrote that the film "will more than satisfy the show's legions of fans." Chang praised the performances of Jackman, Hathaway, Barks, Tveit, Redmayne, and Seyfried (i.e., every leading cast member except Crowe) but said that the film's editing "seems reluctant to slow down and let the viewer simply take in the performances."

Calum Marsh of Slant Magazine gave the film one star out of four, and wrote: "Flaws—and there are a great many that would have never made the cut were this a perfectible studio recording—are conveniently swept under the rug of candid expression ... the worst quality of Les Misérables's live singing is simply that it puts too much pressure on a handful of performers who frankly cannot sing.... Fisheye lenses and poorly framed close-ups abound in Les Misérables, nearly every frame a revelation of one man's bad taste ... One would be hard-pressed to describe this, despite the wealth of beauty on display, as anything but an ugly film, shot and cut ineptly. Everything in the film, songs included, is cranked to 11, the melodrama of it all soaring. So it's odd that this kind of showboating maximalism should be ultimately reduced to a few fisheye'd faces, mugging for their close-up, as the people sing off-key and broken." Chicago Tribune critic Michael Phillips gave the film one and a half stars out of four, writing: "The camera bobs and weaves like a drunk, frantically. So you have hammering close-ups, combined with woozy insecurity each time more than two people are in the frame. ...too little in this frenzied mess of a film registers because Hooper is trying to make everything register at the same nutty pitch."

Some specific performances were reviewed very positively. Anne Hathaway's performance of ballad "I Dreamed a Dream" was met with praise, with many comparing its showstopper-like quality to Jennifer Hudson's performance of "And I Am Telling You I'm Not Going" from Dreamgirls. Christopher Orr of The Atlantic wrote that "Hathaway gives it everything she has, beginning in quiet sorrow before building to a woebegone climax: she gasps, she weeps, she coughs. If you are blown away by the scene—as many will be; it will almost certainly earn Hathaway her first Oscar—this may be the film for you." Ann Hornaday of The Washington Post writes that "The centerpiece of a movie composed entirely of centerpieces belongs to Anne Hathaway, who as the tragic heroine Fantine sings another of the memorable numbers". Joy Tipping of The Dallas Morning News described Hathaway's performance as "angelic".

Claudia Puig of USA Today describes her as "superb as the tragic Fantine". Travers felt that "A dynamite Hathaway shatters every heart when she sings how 'life has killed the dream I dreamed'. Her volcanic performance has Oscar written all over it." Lou Lumenick, critic for New York Post, wrote that the film is "worth seeing for Hathaway alone". She was widely considered to be the frontrunner for the Academy Award for Best Supporting Actress, ultimately winning it.

Eddie Redmayne also received considerable praise for his performance with Bloomberg News saying that "Eddie Redmayne—most recently seen as the eager young production assistant in My Week with Marilyn—delivers by far the most moving and memorable performance in the film as the young firebrand Marius, who, along with his fellow students, is caught up in France's political upheavals in the 19th century."

Samantha Barks earned praise for her portrayal of Éponine, with Digital Journal saying: "Samantha Barks plays Éponine with such grace, sweetness, and sadness that it is hard to imagine anyone else in the role", while Claudia Puig of USA Today calls her "heartbreakingly soulful", Richard Roeper of Chicago Sun-Times described her performance as "star-making".

Crowe's performance was less well received. In response to those criticisms, Tom Hooper told USA Today:
 Emma Gosnell, writing for The Daily Telegraph, stated that she walked out of the showing due to the poor singing, specifically citing Crowe and Jackman as the cause. Playback singer Marni Nixon said "[Crowe] was nothing. It wasn't that he was choosing to sing like that, he just couldn't do anything else" and that Jackman acted well but "could have done with a nobler voice".

Accolades

In 2013, the film was nominated for eight Academy Awards, including Best Picture and Best Actor in a Leading Role for Hugh Jackman, and went on to win in three categories: Best Supporting Actress for Anne Hathaway, Best Makeup and Hairstyling, and Best Sound Mixing.

See also
 Adaptations of Les Misérables

References

External links

 
 
 
 
 
Les Misérables in Armenian

2010s historical films
2010s romantic musical films
2012 romantic drama films
2012 films
Best Musical or Comedy Picture Golden Globe winners
British epic films
British historical musical films
British musical drama films
British romantic drama films
Films based on adaptations
Films based on Les Misérables
Films based on musicals
Films directed by Tom Hooper
Films featuring a Best Musical or Comedy Actor Golden Globe winning performance
Films featuring a Best Supporting Actress Academy Award-winning performance
Films featuring a Best Supporting Actress Golden Globe-winning performance
Films produced by Eric Fellner
Films produced by Tim Bevan
Films scored by Anne Dudley
Films scored by Claude-Michel Schönberg
Films set in 1832
Films set in the 1830s
Films set in France
Films set in Paris
Films shot in England
Films shot in France
Films shot in London
Films that won the Academy Award for Best Makeup
Films that won the Best Sound Mixing Academy Award
British historical romance films
American historical romance films
IMAX films
2010s musical drama films
Relativity Media films
Romantic epic films
Films with screenplays by William Nicholson
Sung-through musical films
Working Title Films films
American historical musical films
BAFTA winners (films)
Universal Pictures films
2010s English-language films
2010s American films
2010s British films